J'entends plus la guitare (also known as I Don't Hear the Guitar Anymore and I Can No Longer Hear the Guitar) is a 1991 French semi-autobiographical drama film written and directed by Philippe Garrel. It was screened in competition at the 48th Venice International Film Festival, in which it won the Silver Lion. The film was given a US release in 2008, to critical acclaim.

Cast 
 Benoît Régent as Gerard
 Johanna ter Steege as Marianne
 Yann Collette as Martin
 Mireille Perrier as Lola
 Brigitte Sy as Aline
 Anouk Grinberg as Adrienne

References

External links

1991 films
1991 drama films
French drama films
Films directed by Philippe Garrel
1990s French-language films
1990s French films